Boļeslavs Sloskāns (1893-1981) was a Latvian Roman Catholic bishop. He was born 31 August 1893 near Stirniene and died on 18 April 1981 in Leuven, Belgium.

Biography
In 1911 Boļeslavs Sloskāns entered the Saint Petersburg Roman Catholic Theological Academy, Russia. He was ordained priest for the Metropolitan Archdiocese of Mohilev by Bishop Jan Cieplak on 21 January 1917 in St. Petersburg. He then served as a parish priest in Russia for several years. He even renounced Latvian citizenship so that he could remain in Russia after Latvian independence.  After Bishop Cieplak was appointed archbishop of Vilnius on 14 December 1925, Fr. Sloskāns was appointed bishop on 5 May 1926.

He was ordained titular bishop of Cillium in secret by Bishop Michel d'Herbigny, S.J., on 10 May 1926 in Moscow. Bishop Aleksander Frison was also ordained during the same secret ceremony. On 13 August 1926 Bishop Sloskāns was appointed apostolic administrator of the Archdiocese of Mohilev as well as apostolic administrator of the Diocese of Minsk. On the same day he assisted Bishop d'Herbigny in the ordination of Anton Malecki as titular bishop of Dionysiana and apostolic administrator for Leningrad.

On 17 September 1927 Bishop Sloskāns was arrested in Minsk by the Soviet authorities. He was then sentenced to three years in prison based on false evidence. He was released in October 1930 after completing his sentence. On 8 November 1930 he was arrested again just one week after arriving back in Mohilev. He served an additional two years in prison until he was repatriated to Latvia on 22 January 1933 in exchange for an accused Soviet spy in the custody of the Latvian government.

Life in exile
After leaving the Soviet Union, Bishop Sloskāns traveled to Rome. The Holy See had only publicly acknowledged the episcopal ordinations of Bishops Sloskāns and Malecki in 1929 when both were in Soviet prisons. Pope Pius XI appointed Bishop Sloskāns an assistant to the Papal Throne on 5 April 1933 in recognition of the harsh treatment he had experienced while imprisoned.

Returning to Latvia, Bishop Sloskāns continued to serve as the apostolic administrator of Mohilev and of Minsk in absentia while he took charge of the Roman Catholic seminary in Riga. In late 1944 he was evacuated to Germany to escape the advancing Soviet army. In 1946 he moved to Belgium where he established a Latvian seminary.

In 1947 Bishop Sloskāns moved to the Benedictine Abbey of Mont César in Leuven. This would remain his home in exile for the remainder of his life. In 1952 Pope Pius XII appointed him Apostolic Visitor for all Russian and Belarusian Catholic émigrés. His commission was expanded to include expatriate Latvian and Estonian Catholics in 1953.

On 8 April 1961 Pope John XXIII appointed him as a consultant to the Papal Commission for the Oriental Churches in preparation for the Second Vatican Council. On 18 November 1964 along with Latvian bishop Jāzeps Rancāns he co-consecrated Bishop Julijans Vaivods, the apostolic administrator of the Archdiocese of Riga and of the Diocese of Liepāja. Bishop Sloskāns participated in all four sessions of the Second Vatican Council and died in 1981.

A memoir of his experiences in Soviet prison was published after his death. In 1993 his remains were transferred from Belgium to Aglona, where they were reinterred at the Basilica of the Assumption there. In December 2004 he was declared Venerable by Pope John Paul II in preparation for potential beatification.

Further reading
  Boleslas Sloskans and François Rouleau (1986). Witness for God among the Godless. Aide à l'église en détresse, Mareil-Marly.

Sources
  About Bishop Boļeslavs Sloskāns
  Catholic Hierarchy

References

External links
  The Venerable Bishop Boļeslavs Sloskāns
  Historical recording of Boļeslavs Sloskāns - Address of welcome at the congress "Kirche in Not" (1956)
  Witness for God among the Godless - Short biography on the occasion of the 30th anniversary of death of Bishop Sloskāns (2011)

1893 births
1981 deaths
People from Vitebsk Governorate
Roman Catholic bishops in the Soviet Union
Venerated Catholics by Pope John Paul II